Honest Life is the fifth studio album by American singer-songwriter Courtney Marie Andrews from Phoenix, Arizona. It was released on August 19, 2016, via Mama Bird Recording Co. Recording sessions took place at Studio Litho in Seattle.

Critical reception

Honest Life was met with generally favorable reviews from critics. At Metacritic, which assigns a weighted average rating out of 100 to reviews from mainstream publications, this release received an average score of 82, based on eight reviews. The aggregator AnyDecentMusic? has the critical consensus of the album at a 7.2 out of 10, based on six reviews. The aggregator Album of the Year assessed the critical consensus as 79 out of 100, based on nine reviews.

Neil McCormick of The Telegraph praised the album, saying "If this was a debut, we would be hailing Andrews as a precocious young genius. But perhaps, in this age of acceleration, amid a pop blizzard of viral memes and instant digital fame, the slow maturing of a truly substantial talent is something to really celebrate". Eric R. Danton of Paste stated, "Like Harris, Andrews' voice can ring out with force of feeling even at its softest, and relying on nuance instead of vocal pyrotechnics turns the song into an intimate confession. She demonstrates that same good taste, and finely honed skill, throughout Honest Life, resulting in an album at once elegant and deeply moving". Harrison Moore of GIGsoup considered that "Courtney Marie Andrews returns with a coming of age album, rich with introspective lyrics and beautifully arranged". Peter Ellman of Exclaim! said, "Andrews grasps her songs tightly. Her lyrics are considered and heartfelt, her vocal performances are clean and pure and the songs are produced and arranged with nuance and precision". The Arts Desk's critic Matthew Wright wrote "she settles on image after image, all authentic and everyday, that distil the hurt and loneliness of break-up". Hal Horowitz of American Songwriter wrote, "Support by sparse but not stark backing, make these ballads glow and shine with a low key luster". Loz Etheridge of God Is in the TV stated, "Perhaps the most obvious comparison in terms of modern contemporaries is the impeccable Swedish duo First Aid Kit".

In a mixed review, The Guardian writer Caroline Sullivan noticed "The delicate lyrical barbs make Honest Life one to hear. It could have done with an upbeat song or two to puncture the introspection, but that's just being picky".

Track listing

Personnel
Courtney Marie Andrews – vocals, guitar, songwriting
Abby Gundersen – harmony vocals
Jonny Gundersen – harmony vocals
Dillon Warnek – electric guitar
Steve Norman – pedal steel guitar
Charles Wicklander – piano
Andrew Butler – organ
Alex Sabel – bass
William Mapp – drums
Rebecca Chung – cello
Andrew Joslyn – violin
Floyd Reitsma – engineering, mixing, recording
Ed Brooks – mastering
Adam Gonsalves – lacquer cut
Barna Howard – design
Suzy Sundborg – photography

Charts

References

External links

2016 albums
Courtney Marie Andrews albums